Dance Like Nobody's Watching may refer to:

 Dance Like Nobody's Watching (EP), a 2006 EP by Suburban Legends
 "Dance Like Nobody's Watching" (30 Rock), a 2012 episode of the sitcom 30 Rock
 "Dance Like Nobody's Watching" (song), a 2020 song by Iggy Azalea and Tinashe